Ross Marlo Anthony Lence, was a professor of Political Science at the University of Houston from 1971 to 2006, where he was John and Rebecca Moores Scholar and held the Ross M. Lence Distinguished Teaching Chair. He taught Political Philosophy, American Political Thought, and American Government as a member of the Political Science and Honors College faculties.  His edited volume of the works of John C. Calhoun, Union and Liberty: The Political Philosophy of John C. Calhoun, is one of the foremost references on the statesman.

Lence was the recipient of an unprecedented number of Teaching Excellence Awards from the University of Houston and the State of Texas.  In January 2007, in memory of Lence, the College of Liberal Arts and Social Sciences at the University of Houston renamed its teaching excellence awards the Ross M. Lence Awards for Teaching Excellence in the College of Liberal Arts and Social Sciences.

Biography
Lence was born in Whitefish, Montana on December 19, 1943.  His father, Marlo, was a foreman on the Great Northern Railway; his mother, Nickie stayed home to raise Ross and his brother, John, before taking a job to run a photography studio.  
Ross graduated from Whitefish High School with a 4.0 GPA and was valedictorian of his class.  After completing his Bachelor's Degree at the University of Chicago, in 1966 Ross studied at Georgetown University, then at Indiana University under Charles S. Hyneman, who took Ross on a 15,000 mile, 5-year trip across America to give Ross first-hand experience of the country.  
He graduated from Indiana University in 1970 with a Ph.D. 
In 1970, Ross researched at The British Museum.

He began teaching at the University of Houston in 1971, where he also served as Director of Undergraduate Studies in the Department of Political Science for 23 years.  Throughout his career, Lence was a perennial participant, leader, and director at Liberty Fund Colloquia.  He died on July 11, 2006 in Houston, Texas after a bout with pancreatic cancer.

Scholarship 

As a scholar, Ross published articles and edited books on American Political Thought. His article on Thomas Jefferson and the Declaration of Independence offered a deliberate, close reading of the Declaration as the key founding document in American political history. This article has been made accessible with permission.

See also 
 John C.Calhoun
 University of Houston
 Social Sciences

References 

Ross M. Lence, R.I.P.
University of Houston Honors College Tribute
Ted Estess' Eulogy
Ross M. Lence "On Teaching"
The Abbeville Institute's Tribute
Houston Chronicle Obituary Guestbook

1943 births
2006 deaths
American political scientists
People from Whitefish, Montana
Indiana University alumni
University of Chicago alumni
University of Houston faculty
20th-century political scientists